Bolshaya Shelkovka is a rural locality (a selo) and the administrative center of Bolsheshelkovnikovsky Selsoviet, Rubtsovsky District, Altai Krai, Russia. The population was 384 as of 2013. There are 3 streets.

Geography 
Bolshaya Shelkovka is located 44 km southwest of Rubtsovsk (the district's administrative centre) by road. Vtorye Korosteli is the nearest rural locality.

References 

Rural localities in Rubtsovsky District